Ron Stockman (born 19 August 1934) is a former Australian rules footballer who played with Footscray and South Melbourne in the Victorian Football League (VFL) during the 1950s.

Stockman was a member of the Bulldog's 1954 premiership side, his goal in the third quarter was the only goal he kicked in his 96-game career.

External links

1934 births
Australian rules footballers from Victoria (Australia)
Western Bulldogs players
Western Bulldogs Premiership players
Sydney Swans players
West Footscray Football Club players
Living people
One-time VFL/AFL Premiership players